Vicente Barrantes (1829, Badajoz – 1898) was a Spanish bibliophile, poet and writer.

Criticism by Rizal
Jose Rizal, the national hero of the Philippines, wrote two letters addressing Barrantes' criticism of the Noli Me Tángere and the Tagalog theater.

Narrative works
Juan de Padilla Madrid, p. I, 1855, p. II, 1856 (Imp of Ramon Campuzano), historical novel.
Always late, Madrid, 1852 (C. Gonzalez), original novel, reprinted in Madrid (Printing of Alhambra and Company) 1862.
Padilla's widow Madrid, 1857 (Impr. Gabriel Alhambra), historical novel.
Narratives Extremadura Madrid, 1873 (Imp of J. Peña)
Tales and legends Madrid, 1875 (P. Muñez)
The popular narrative veinteicuatro Cordoba Cordoba (Imp and lib. D. Rafael Arroyo), 1859.
The soldier's beloved, New York, novels collection Chronicle (1848–1851)
A literary suicide. She Spain.
The court poets. Historical novel of 1619.
Don Rodrigo Calderon. Historical novel, serial, published in The Enlightenment, 1851–1852.

References

1829 births
1898 deaths
People from Badajoz
Spanish poets
Writers from Extremadura
Members of the Royal Spanish Academy
Spanish male poets
19th-century Spanish poets
19th-century male writers